Victor Dubuisson (born 22 April 1990) is a French professional golfer who plays on the European Tour.

Amateur career
Dubuisson was born in Cannes. He enjoyed a successful amateur career, during which he won several major amateur tournaments, including the 2009 European Amateur, and was the number one ranked amateur player in the world for eight weeks from 4 November to 23 December 2009.

As an amateur he also entered and made the cut in several professional tournaments, the highlight being a third-place finish at the 2009 Allianz EurOpen de Lyon on the Challenge Tour. He qualified for his first European Tour event at 15 years old, at the 2005 Open de France, missing the cut. In 2010 he qualified for The Open Championship, missing the cut; he turned professional shortly after the Open.

Professional career
At the end of 2010 Dubuisson entered the European Tour qualifying school, where he finished 11th earning a tour card.

He ended 52nd in the 2012 Race to Dubai. He won for the first time as a professional at the 2013 Turkish Airlines Open. With seven top 10s, he ranked sixth at the 2013 Race to Dubai.

Dubuisson finished second in the 2014 WGC-Accenture Match Play Championship to Jason Day. The match play event ended on the 23rd hole. Thanks to this result, he earned enough non-member FedEx Cup points to be eligible for "Special Temporary Membership" on the PGA Tour, which he accepted. This allowed him unlimited sponsor exemptions for the remainder of the 2014 season. He finished 9th at the 2014 Open Championship and 7th at the PGA Championship. At the end of the 2014 PGA Tour season, his total earnings of US$670,000 as a non-member allowed him to earn a PGA Tour card for the 2014–15 season.

In September 2014 he gained an automatic selection to represent the winning European team at the 2014 Ryder Cup. He paired with Graeme McDowell in two victorious foursomes matches against Phil Mickelson and Keegan Bradley (won by 3 and 2), and Jimmy Walker and Rickie Fowler (won by 5 and 4); in the final game of the singles, he halved his match with Zach Johnson.

In 2015 Dubuisson shared his time between the European Tour and the PGA Tour. While his season in Europe was successful, with a second win at the Turkish Airlines Open, he failed to make an impact in America where he made only 4 cuts in the 10 events, finishing 190th in the FedEx Cup and losing his tour card.

In 2016 and 2017 Dubuisson played on the European Tour. He made 21 cuts and earned more than €2,000,000 in total during those two seasons. In 2018, he was sidelined for the majority of the season with a pretty serious injury. After undergoing an operation on his sinuses in late 2017, Dubuisson suffered a perforated eardrum after flying back from the Open de Espana and was ruled out indefinitely. "My eardrum was hit on the plane on the way back from Spain then, back home, it exploded," he told reporters in late May 2018. "I was forced to have surgery and I can't fly. My season is over. I can't hear anything on the left side."

Dubuisson returned to the European Tour in 2019, making the cut in 13 of his 20 tournaments and placing in the top 20 on five occasions. He played only seven times on the 2020 Tour, however these appearances included two top 10 finishes. 2021 has seen Dubuisson return as a regular player on the European Tour again, including 8 tournament entries by May.

Amateur wins
2006 French Amateur (closed)
2008 Mexican Amateur
2009 European Amateur, Trophée des Régions

Professional wins (3)

European Tour wins (2)

European Tour playoff record (0–1)

French Tour wins (1)

Results in major championships

CUT = missed the half-way cut
"T" = tied

Results in World Golf Championships
Results not in chronological order before 2015.

QF, R16, R32, R64 = Round in which player lost in match play
WD = withdrew
"T" = tied

PGA Tour career summary

*As of the 2015–16 season.

European Tour career summary

*As of 23 October 2018. There is duplication between PGA Tour and European Tour stats for wins, top 10s and money earned in World Golf Championships and Major Championships.

Team appearances
Amateur
European Boys' Team Championship (representing France): 2005, 2007
European Youths' Team Championship (representing France): 2006
Jacques Léglise Trophy (representing Continental Europe): 2006 (winners)
Junior Ryder Cup (representing Europe): 2006 (tie, Cup retained)
European Boys' Team Championship (representing France): 2007
European Amateur Team Championship (representing France): 2007, 2008, 2009, 2010
Eisenhower Trophy (representing France): 2008
Bonallack Trophy (representing Europe): 2010 (selected, but tournament cancelled)

Professional
World Cup (representing France): 2013, 2016
EurAsia Cup (representing Europe): 2014, 2016 (winners)
Ryder Cup (representing Europe): 2014 (winners)

Ryder Cup points record

See also
2010 European Tour Qualifying School graduates

References

External links

French male golfers
European Tour golfers
PGA Tour golfers
Ryder Cup competitors for Europe
Sportspeople from Cannes
Sportspeople from Alpes-Maritimes
People from Antibes
1990 births
Living people